In manufacturing and mechanical engineering, flatness is an important geometric condition for workpieces and tools.

In the manufacture of precision parts and assemblies, especially where parts will be required to be connected across a surface area in an air-tight or liquid-tight manner, flatness is a critical quality of the manufactured surfaces. Such surfaces are usually machined or ground to achieve the required degree of flatness. High-definition metrology, such as digital holographic interferometry, of such a surface to confirm and ensure that the required degree of flatness has been achieved is a key step in such manufacturing processes. Flatness may be defined in terms of least squares fit to a plane ("statistical flatness"), worst-case or overall flatness (the distance between the two closest parallel planes within).

Two parts that are flat to about 1 helium light band (HLB) can be "wrung" together, which means they will cling to each other when placed in contact. This phenomenon is commonly used with gauge blocks.

Geometric dimensioning and tolerancing has provided geometrically defined, quantitative ways of defining flatness operationally.

History
Joseph Whitworth popularized the first practical method of making accurate flat surfaces during the 1830s, using engineer's blue and scraping techniques on three trial surfaces, in what is known as Whitworth's three plates method. By testing all three in pairs against each other, it is ensured that the surfaces become flat. Using two surfaces would result in a concave surface and a convex surface. Eventually a point is reached when many points of contact are visible within each square inch, at which time the three surfaces are uniformly flat to a very close tolerance.

Up until his introduction of the scraping technique, the same three plate method was employed using polishing techniques, giving less accurate results. This led to an explosion of development of precision instruments using these flat surface generation techniques as a basis for further construction of precise shapes.

References
 Wayne R. Moore, Foundations of Mechanical Accuracy, Moore Special Tool Company, Bridgeport, CT (1970)
 Whitworth, J. 1858, Plane Metallic Surfaces, Longman, Brown, and Co., London & Manchester.

External links
Flatness Overview - GD&T Basics
Two surface plates made by Whitworth
What is the right Flatness Tolerance for a Gasket Application

Metalworking terminology
Planes (geometry)

ja:公差
pt:Tolerância (engenharia)